In Good King Charles's Golden Days is a play by George Bernard Shaw, subtitled A True History that Never Happened.

It was written in 1938-39 as an "educational history film" for film director Gabriel Pascal in the aftermath of Pygmalions cinema triumph. The cast of the proposed film were to be sumptuously clothed in 17th century costumes, far beyond the resources of most theatre managements.  However, by the time of its completion in May 1939, it had turned into a Shavian Restoration comedy.

The title of the play is taken from the first line of the traditional song "The Vicar of Bray".

Plot 
The setting is the English court during the reign of Charles II of England (reigned 1660–1685). A discussion play, the issues of nature, science, power and leadership are debated between King Charles II ('Mr Rowley'), Isaac Newton, George Fox and the artist Godfrey Kneller, with interventions by three of the king's mistresses (Barbara Villiers, 1st Duchess of Cleveland; Louise de Kérouaille, Duchess of Portsmouth; and Nell Gwynn). The short second Act involves Charles in conversation with his queen, Catherine of Braganza.

Original production
Billed as 'A history lesson in three scenes by Bernard Shaw', the first production was at the Malvern Festival Theatre on 12 August 1939, directed by H K Ayliff and designed by Paul Shelving.

Cast:
Mrs Basham:  Isobel Thornton
Sally:  Betty Marsden
Isaac Newton: Cecil Trouncer 
George Fox: Herbert Lomas
Mr Rowley (King Charles II): Ernest Thesiger
Nell Gwynn: Eileen Beldon
Barbara Villiers, 1st Duchess of Cleveland; Daphne Heard
Louise de Kérouaille, Duchess of Portsmouth: Ina De La Haye
James, Duke of York: William Hutchison
Godfrey Kneller: Alec Clunes
Queen Catherine of Braganza: Violet Vanbrugh

Ayliff's production first transferred to the Streatham Hill Theatre on 15 April 1940, then to the New Theatre in London on 9 May 1940.

James Agate, writing for The Sunday Times, noted that the play was the best to have "come from the Shavian loom since Methuselah".

Revivals
Ernest Thesiger, who again played 'Mr Rowley', revived the play at the Malvern Festival on 11 August 1949. It was also revived at the Malvern Festival Theatre in 1983.

A radio production was broadcast on the BBC Third Programme on September 18th 1949 with Abraham Sofaer in the title role. 

The first North American production was on 24 January 1957 at the Downtown Theater on New York's East 4th Street, where it ran for nearly two years, one of the longest runs of any Shaw play in the USA (as noted by Lawrence Langner).

A BBC production in the Play of the Month series, starring Sir John Gielgud as King Charles, was broadcast in February 1970.

References

In Good King Charles's Golden Days by Bernard Shaw, with 12 text illustrations by Feliks Topolski,  Constable, London (1939)
File on Shaw, compiled by Margery Morgan, Methuen, London (1989) 
Bernard Shaw, a biography by Michael Holroyd in five volumes, Chatto and Windus (1988-1992)
Shaw's preface to the play, first published in the collected edition of Geneva, Cymbeline Refinished and In Good King Charles's Golden Days, Constable (1947)
Bernard Shaw: The Complete Prefaces, volume III, 1930–1950, edited by Dan H Laurence and Daniel J Leary, Allen Lane, The Penguin Press (1997) 

1939 plays
Plays set in the 17th century
Plays by George Bernard Shaw
Cultural depictions of Isaac Newton
Cultural depictions of Charles II of England
Cultural depictions of Barbara Palmer, 1st Duchess of Cleveland
Cultural depictions of Louise de Kérouaille, Duchess of Portsmouth
Cultural depictions of Nell Gwyn
Cultural depictions of Catherine of Braganza